Jun Nagao (born March 1, 1964) is a Japanese composer.

Nagao began his career as an arranger for orchestras and wind ensembles. Today he is known for his many original compositions including several works for video games and films. He won the 2000 Toru Takemitsu Composition Award for his work entitled L'été-L'oubli rouge.

Wind ensemble works 
 Symphony (1997)
 Reminiscence (1997)
 Die Heldenzeit Concerto for Alto Saxophone and Wind ensemble (1998)
 The Other Garden Concerto for Euphonium and Wind ensemble (1998)
 Wavetops (2000)
 Souten no shizuku (2001)
 La saison lumineuse du vent vert (2002)
 Fluttering Maple Leaves (2003)
 Kompeki no Hatou (2005)
 Saiwai no Ryu(Der Glücksdrache) (2005)
 Auspicious Snow (2007)
 The Everlasting Trunk (2007)
 By Gathering Together (2008)
 Un morceau du ciel (2008)
 Sing with Sincerity (2008)
 Triton (2008)
 Four Seasons of Trouvère for saxophone and wind ensemble

Chamber music 
 Quatuor de Saxophones (2002)
 Your Kindness for alto saxophone and piano (2003)
 The Planets by Trouvere for saxophone quartet (2004)
 Paganini Lost for two alto saxophones and piano (2008)
 Dawn Passage for four clarinets
 Futarishizuka for solo flute
 Icare for trombone and piano
 Palsifaliana for trombone and piano
 Purity for solo flute
 Rhapsody on "Carmen" by Georges Bizet for saxophone quartet and piano

Film music 
 2001 Le Petit poucet

TV music 
 1993 Ryukyu no Kaze

Video game music 
 1995 Romance of the Three Kingdoms IV – Wall of Fire originally titled San goku shi IV

External links 
 

1964 births
Japanese classical composers
Japanese film score composers
Japanese male classical composers
Japanese male film score composers
Japanese television composers
Living people
Male television composers
Musicians from Ibaraki Prefecture
Video game composers